{{DISPLAYTITLE:conio.h}}

conio.h  is a C header file used mostly by MS-DOS compilers to provide console input/output.  It is not part of the C standard library or ISO C, nor is it defined by POSIX.

This header declares several useful library functions for performing "istream input and output" from a program. Most C compilers that target DOS, Windows 3.x, Phar Lap, DOSX, OS/2, or Win32 have this header and supply the associated library functions in the default C library. Most C compilers that target UNIX and Linux do not have this header and do not supply the library functions. Some embedded systems or cc65 use a conio-compatible library.

The library functions declared by  vary somewhat from compiler to compiler. As originally implemented in Lattice C, the various functions mapped directly to the first few DOS INT 21H functions. The library supplied with Borland's Turbo C did not use the DOS API but instead accessed video RAM directly for output and used BIOS interrupt calls. This library also has additional functions inspired from the successful Turbo Pascal one.

Compilers that target non-DOS operating systems, such as Linux or OS/2, provide similar solutions; the unix-related curses library is very common here. Another example is SyncTERM's ciolib. The version of  done by DJ Delorie for the GO32 extender is particularly extensive.

Member functions

References

External links
 Microsoft's documentation
 Digital Mars's documentation
 IO FAQ - explanation and suggestions for non-standard console IO
 Borland-style CONIO implementation for MinGW/Dev-C++
 List of ways to get raw keyboard input

C (programming language) headers
Conio
Text mode
Text user interface
Text user interface libraries